Adeel is a Muslim male name in South Asia.

Given name
 Adeel Ahmed (born 1983), Pakistani footballer
 Adeel Ahmed, Pakistani politician
 Adeel Akhtar (born 1980), English actor
 Adeel Chaudhry (born 1988), Pakistani-Canadian singer-songwriter and actor
 Adeel Hussain (born 1978), Pakistani actor and director
 Adeel Malik (born 1985), Pakistani cricketer
 Adeel Raja (born 1980), Dutch cricketer
 Adeel Razzaq, Pakistani writer
 Adeel Shahzad, Pakistani politician
 Adeel Ahmed (born 1988), Pakistani footballer
 Adeel Alam (born 1986), American professional wrestler known by his ring name  Ali

Surname
 Haji Muhammad Adeel, Pakistani politician

Arabic-language surnames
Arabic masculine given names
Pakistani masculine given names